Vincenzo Colosimo (February 16, 1878 – May 11, 1920), known as James "Big Jim" Colosimo or as "Diamond Jim", was an Italian-American Mafia crime boss who emigrated from Calabria, Italy, in 1895 and built a criminal empire in Chicago based on prostitution, gambling and racketeering. He gained power through petty crime and by heading a chain of brothels. From about 1902 until his death in 1920, he led a gang that became known after his death as the Chicago Outfit. Colosimo was assassinated on May 11, 1920, and no one was ever charged with his murder. Johnny Torrio, an enforcer whom Colosimo imported in 1909 from New York, seized control of Colosimo's businesses after his death. Al Capone, a close associate of Torrio, has been accused of involvement in Colosimo's murder, but was not yet in Chicago at the time.

Early years
Colosimo was born on February 16, 1878, to Luigi Colosimo and his second wife Giuseppina Mascaro in the town of Colosimi, Province of Cosenza, Italy. He emigrated from Italy to Chicago at the age of 17, starting out as a petty criminal. Colosimo attracted the attention of First Ward aldermen Michael "Hinky Dink" Kenna and John Coughlin. They made him a precinct captain and later their bagman. This gave Colosimo the political connections that helped him in his rise to power as a mob boss.

Prostitution empire
Later, Colosimo acquired another nickname, "Diamond Jim," because he frequently dressed in a white suit and wore diamond pins, rings and other jewelry. This, combined with his personal charm and money, helped him establish relationships with women. He had a love of both women and money, which fueled his enthusiasm for prostitution. In 1902, Colosimo married Victoria Moresco, an established Chicago madam and together they opened a second brothel. Torrio was the nephew of Moresco. According to Laurence Bergreen, "Torrio is [also] described as Colosimo’s nephew, but in the absence of any evidence to confirm the relationship, it is more likely their kinship was spiritual rather than familial." There are also references to Colosimo's wife being somehow related to John Torrio. 

Among his first brothels were The Victoria, on Armour Avenue (named in honor of his wife) and The Saratoga, at Dearborn and 22nd Street. Within a few years, Colosimo had expanded this to nearly 200 brothels and had also made inroads into gambling and racketeering. Colosimo was reputedly making $50,000 ($ 720 000 in 2022) per month from his various legal and illegal operations.

Help from New York
By 1909, Black Hand extortion was a serious threat to Colosimo in Chicago. He brought in gangster John "The Fox" Torrio from Brooklyn and made him his second in command. The following year, he opened Colosimo's Cafe, a restaurant and nightclub at 2126 South Wabash. It quickly became a popular destination for prominent Chicagoans and visitors to Chicago. In 1919, Torrio and Colosimo opened a brothel at 2222 South Wabash called the Four Deuces, a reference to the address. Torrio hired his old Brooklyn colleague Al Capone to work as a bartender and bouncer, which gave Capone his entry into Chicago crime.

Betrayal

When Prohibition went into effect in 1920, Torrio pushed for the gang to enter into bootlegging, but Colosimo stubbornly refused. In March 1920, Colosimo secured an uncontested divorce from Moresco. A month later, he and Dale Winter eloped to West Baden Springs, Indiana. Upon their return, he bought a home on the South Side. On May 11, 1920, Torrio called and told Colosimo that a shipment was about to arrive at his restaurant. Colosimo drove there to await it, but instead he was shot in an ambush and killed. Frankie Yale had allegedly traveled from New York to Chicago and personally killed longtime gang boss Colosimo at the behest of Torrio and Capone. Although suspected by Chicago police, Yale was never officially charged. Colosimo was allegedly murdered because he stood in the way of his gang making bootlegging profits, having "gone soft" after his marriage with Winter. Al Capone has also been suggested as the gunman. Colosimo's ex-wife, unhappy with the financial arrangements of the divorce, is also theorized having arranged the murder.

Colosimo was the first gang leader to organize the disparate parts of Chicago's crime scene. After his death, Torrio took over his gang, later to be replaced by Al Capone. His mob eventually became the infamous Chicago Outfit that ruled over some parts of the city.

Colosimo was interred at Oak Woods Cemetery in Chicago, witnessed by 5,000 mourners.

In popular media

Film
In Scarface: The Shame of a Nation (1932), the death of "Big Louie" Costillo (Harry J. Vejar) is loosely based on Colosimo's assassination. Big Louie is killed by Antonio "Tony" Camonte at the behest of his friend Johnny Lovo, Costillo's right-hand man. Lovo was based on Johnny Torrio and Camonte on Al Capone, and the film presents Costillo's murder as the beginning of Lovo and Camonte's involvement in bootlegging, similar to how Colosimo's refusal to allow bootlegging is considered the primary reason for his murder.
 Joe De Santis played Colosimo in Al Capone (1959).
 Frank Campanella played Colosimo in Capone (1975).

Television
Colosimo was portrayed by Peter Siragusa in the pilot episode of The Untouchables (1993).
Colosimo and a fictionalized account of his murder was the subject of a 1993 episode of The Young Indiana Jones Chronicles, titled "Young Indiana Jones and the Mystery of the Blues."  Colosimo was portrayed by Raymond Serra, Victoria Moresco by Linda Lutz, and Dale Winter by Jane Krakowski.
Colosimo was portrayed by Peter Banks in a 1994 episode of In Suspicious Circumstances, titled No Witness, No Case (a reference to a prostitute who Colosimo had sent from Chicago to Connecticut, who was murdered after she talked to the police).
In 2010, Colosimo's murder was depicted in the series premiere of HBO's Boardwalk Empire. It depicts Colosimo, played by Frank Crudele, as the victim of a hit ordered by Torrio and committed by Frankie Yale to allow Torrio to go into bootlegging.
 He was portrayed by Andre King in the 2016 docuseries The Making of the Mob: Chicago.

Music
In Ian Hunter’s song "Resurrection Mary", the story-teller, who sees the infamous ghost of the title, used to do "the numbers for Big Jim."

See also
List of unsolved murders

References

Further reading
Bilek, Arthur J.  The First Vice Lord: Big Jim Colosimo and the Ladies of the Levee.  Nashville: Cumberland House, 2008.

1878 births
1920 murders in the United States
1920 deaths
Al Capone associates
American brothel owners and madams
American crime bosses
Deaths by firearm in Illinois
Italian emigrants to the United States
Italian gangsters
Murdered American gangsters of Italian descent
People from Chicago
People from Cosenza
People murdered in Illinois
Male murder victims
Prohibition-era gangsters
Unsolved murders in the United States
Murdered criminals